Webster Lake or Lake Webster may refer to a water body in the United States:

Lake Chaubunagungamaug, or "Webster Lake", in Webster, Massachusetts
Webster Lake (Indiana) in North Webster, Indiana
Webster Lake (Berrien County, Michigan), a lake in Michigan
Webster Lake (New Hampshire), in Franklin, New Hampshire
 Webster Lake, EP by A Loss for Words